Rostanga setidens is a species of sea slug, a dorid nudibranch. It is a marine gastropod mollusc in the family Discodorididae.

Distribution
This species was described from Norway.

DescriptionRostanga setidens is white in colour, a character shared only with Rostanga phepha and Rostanga ankyra''.

References

Discodorididae
Gastropods described in 1939